Sam Oropeza (born June 17, 1985) is a former American mixed martial artist, coach, manager, boxer, and politician who most notably competed in Bellator's middleweight and welterweight divisions. Oropeza had 16 professional MMA fights racking up an impressive 13-3 record. Oropeza competed professionally as a boxer where he competed as a cruiserweight and was undefeated in 2 fights.

Oropeza is currently a candidate for a at-large seat on Philadelphia City Council in 2023

Background
Oropeza was born in Briarcliffe, Pennsylvania as the youngest of six children. At the age of 10, Oropeza lost his father to liver failure. During his youth, Oropeza wrestled at Monsignor Bonner High School. In 2006, he started to practice Brazilian jiu-jitsu and in 2008 he earned a purple belt. In the same year, he fought as an amateur in mixed martial arts for the first time.

Mixed martial arts career

King of the Cage and Strikeforce
Oropeza rattled off 2 amateur finishes for New Breed Fighters in late 2008 before turning pro in 2009. He made his professional debut on June 6, 2009 against Mitch Filer at World Cage Fighting Alliance in Atlantic City, New Jersey and defeated him via rear naked choke in the first round. From 2009 to 2010, he was victorious against Dustin Collins via submission, Dave Concepcion via head kick knockout, and Koa Ramos via guillotine choke at KOTC: Honor Oropeza's first defeat was against fellow undefeated prospect Myles Jury at KOTC: No Mercy. He bounced back on the biggest stage of his career up to that point by submitting Don Carlo-Clauss in front of 11,287 fans at Strikeforce: Fedor vs. Silva.

TV Appearances
In 2010 Sam Oropeza was selected to do a taping for the MTV show Bully Beatdown. The premise of this show was to put 'real life bullies' in the cage to fight professional mma fighters. If the bully is defeated, the bully's victims can receive up to $10,000. If the bully defeats the Fighter, he earns $10,000. The episode aired on MTV2 in 2012 and was titled David: Tears of A Clown. Oropeza made the bully tap out 5 times in round 1 and stopped the fight with a TKO in round 2, earning the bully's victims $10,000.

Oropeza also appeared on Kevin Smith's show, Comic Book Men, on AMC. Oropeza was seen portraying Jay from the Jay and Silent Bob duo in a staged fight between the 2 cult heroes.

Bellator Fighting Championships, Matrix Fights and Xtreme Fight Events
Boasting a 5-1 record, Oropeza made his Bellator debut against Giedrius Karavackas on May 14, 2011 at Bellator 44. The fight was televised live nationally on MTV2. He was defeated via submission due to a scarf hold armlock in the third round.

After an extended break from competition, Oropeza returned to face Aung La Nsang on March 16, 2012 at Matrix Fights 5. He won via submission due to a triangle choke in the second round.

Oropeza faced Richard Rigmaden on October 13, 2012 at XFE: Cage Wars 18. He won via submission due to an armbar early in the first round.

In February 2013, it was announced that Oropeza has signed a long-term contract with Bellator.

Bellator return
Oropeza returned to the Bellator cage 2 years after he debuted to face Shedrick Goodridge on April 4, 2013 at Bellator 95. He won via TKO in the second round. It was later revealed Oropeza finished his opponent despite having suffered a broken tibia in the round.

On September 20, 2013 at Matrix Fights 8, in front of a home town crowd in South Philadelphia, Pennsylvania, Oropeza defeated Brett Oteri via TKO in the first round.

Oropeza faced Chip Moraza-Pollard on November 15, 2013 at Bellator 108. He won via TKO early in round one.

Oropeza was expected to face Fight Master winner Joe Riggs in the quarterfinal match of Bellator season ten welterweight tournament on March 14, 2014 at Bellator 112. Riggs, however, pulled out of the bout and was replaced by Cristiano Souza. The Fight was televised live nationally on Spike TV. Oropeza won the fight via TKO in the first round.

Move to Middleweight
Oropeza was unable to make weight for the rescheduled semi-final bout of the Bellator Season 10 Welterweight Tournament against Andrey Koreshkov. It is expected he will be making a move up in weight after difficulties with weight cutting. Bellator CEO Bjorn Rebney stated “he got within 1.7 pound this time but then he just said I’m done. I am going to end up going to the hospital. I am finished but last time he was seven or eight over. Last time he was clearly missing and this time he could have conceptually made it, but you get to that point where you say stop because you are going to end up in the hospital and he did. One seventy is just to small for him.”

Oropeza made his middleweight return against Gary Tapusoa on October 24, 2014 at Bellator 130. He won the fight via TKO in the first round.

Global Proving Ground
After 4 straight first-round TKO wins, 3 under the Bellator banner, Oropeza asked for and was granted his release from Bellator MMA.
Oropeza was very open about his desire to fight in the UFC and hoped to sign a contract with the UFC before the end of 2015. Oropeza fought on January 17, 2015 for Global Proving Ground and defeated Timothy Woods in the first round in the main event at Global Proving Ground 17. His victory was changed to a No Contest.

Caged Fury Fighting Championships
Oropeza next signed a multi-fight deal with Caged Fury Fighting Championships a contract which includes a UFC clause allowing him to leave CFFC if the UFC offers him a fight. Oropeza was scheduled to fight at CFFC 52 on Halloween 10/31/2015 at the Borgata Casino Hotel, in Atlantic City, New Jersey. This would be his official CFFC debut. His opponent was scheduled to be Levon Maynard. The fight was a 175lb Catchweight fight. Maynard defeated Oropeza by unanimous decision.

Hiatus from MMA
After his first ever loss by decision Oropeza announced he was taking time off from professional MMA for personal reasons. He then transitioned from mixed martial arts to professional boxing. Oropeza has not been in the cage since Halloween 2015 however he has recently teased a return. It is rumored he will be fighting in the spring or summer of 2018

Return to the Cage
Oropeza officially announced he will return to the cage on May 18, 2018 at Art Of War 7 at the 2300 Arena in south Philadelphia, PA. It has been announced that Oropeza will be the Main Event and face Nick Wagner (7-6-1 MMA Record according to sherdog.com) in a 185LB Middeweight bout. Nick Wagner pulled out of the fight for undisclosed reasons. Sharif Jones (3-3 MMA Record according to sherdog.com and Tapology) stepped in on short notice. https://www.tapology.com/fightcenter/fighters/25096-sharif-jones Jones most Notably lost a split decision to MMA veteran Will Martinez (13-3 MMA record according to sherdog.com) This fight was cancelled due to Sharif Jones medical work not being submitted by the deadline.

Boxing career
Oropeza is 2-0 as a professional boxer. He made his return to professional combat sports on March 11, 2017 after a lengthy hiatus and knocked out his opponent Joe Parkinson (0-1) in 35 seconds. The fight took place at the Sugar House casino in Philadelphia, Pennsylvania for King's Promotions. Oropeza has plans to continue his fighting career as a boxer.

Oropeza returned to the squared circle on May 12, 2017 once again for King's Promotions. He faced Kyle Mcnutt in a cruiserweight tilt. Oropeza scored knockdowns in the 1st and 4th rounds on his way to a unanimous decision victory.

Political career
Oropeza was nominated by Republicans for a special election to the Pennsylvania Senate's 5th district in 2022.

Mixed martial arts record

|-
| Loss 
| align=center| 13–3
| Levon Maynard
| Decision (Unanimous)
| CFFC 52
| 
| align=center| 3
| align=center| 5:00
| Atlantic City, New Jersey, United States
| Catchweight (175 lb) bout.
|-
| Win
| align=center| 13–2
| Timothy Woods
| KO (Slam)
| Global Proving Ground
| 
| align=center| 1
| align=center| 0:51
| Pennsauken, New Jersey, United States
| 
|-
| Win
| align=center| 12–2
| Gary Tapusoa
| TKO (punches)
| Bellator 130
| 
| align=center| 1
| align=center| 2:31
| Mulvane, Kansas, United States
| 
|-
| Win
| align=center| 11–2
| Cristiano Souza
| TKO (punches)
| Bellator 112
| 
| align=center| 1
| align=center| 3:07
| Hammond, Indiana
| Bellator Season Ten Welterweight Tournament Quarterfinal.
|-
| Win
| align=center| 10–2
| Chip Moraza-Pollard
| TKO (punches)
| Bellator 108
| 
| align=center| 1
| align=center| 0:37
| Atlantic City, New Jersey, United States
| 
|-
| Win
| align=center| 9–2
| Brett Oteri
| TKO (punches)
| Matrix Fights 8
| 
| align=center| 1
| align=center| 3:32
| Philadelphia, Pennsylvania, United States
| 
|-
| Win
| align=center| 8–2
| Shedrick Goodridge
| TKO (punches)
| Bellator 95
| 
| align=center| 2
| align=center| 4:22
| Atlantic City, New Jersey, United States
| 
|-
| Win
| align=center| 7–2
| Richard Rigmaden
| Submission (armbar)
| XFE: Cage Wars 18
| 
| align=center| 1
| align=center| 1:31
| Chester, Pennsylvania, United States
| 
|-
| Win
| align=center| 6–2
| Aung La Nsang
| Submission (triangle choke)
| Matrix Fights 5
| 
| align=center| 2
| align=center| 0:56
| Philadelphia, Pennsylvania, United States
| 
|-
| Loss
| align=center| 5–2
| Giedrius Karavackas
| Submission (scarf-hold armlock)
| Bellator 44
| 
| align=center| 3
| align=center| 3:59
| Atlantic City, New Jersey, United States
| 
|-
| Win
| align=center| 5–1
| Don Carlo-Clauss
| TKO (submission to punches)
| Strikeforce: Fedor vs. Silva
| 
| align=center| 1
| align=center| 4:10
| East Rutherford, New Jersey, United States
| 
|-
| Loss
| align=center| 4–1
| Myles Jury
| Submission (standing rear-naked choke)
| KOTC: No Mercy
| 
| align=center| 1
| align=center| 2:55
| Mashantucket, Connecticut, United States
| 
|-
| Win
| align=center| 4–0
| Koa Ramos
| Submission (guillotine choke)
| KOTC: Honor
| 
| align=center| 1
| align=center| 0:50
| Mescalero, New Mexico, United States
| 
|-
| Win
| align=center| 3–0
| Dave Concepción
| KO (head kick)
| Adrenaline: New Breed
| 
| align=center| 1
| align=center| 0:09
| Atlantic City, New Jersey, United States
| 
|-
| Win
| align=center| 2–0
| Dustin Collins
| Submission (armbar)
| Arena Rumble: Horn vs. Guida
| 
| align=center| 2
| align=center| 4:19
| Spokane, Washington, United States
| 
|-
| Win
| align=center| 1–0
| Mitch Filer
| Submission (rear-naked choke)
| WCA: Caged Combat
| 
| align=center| 1
| align=center| 0:47
| Atlantic City, New Jersey, United States
|

Boxing record

|-

| Win
| align=center| 2–0
| Kyle Mcnutt
| Decision (Unanimous)
| Kings Promotions
| 
| align=center| 4
| align=center| 12:00
| Philadelphia, Pennsylvania, United States
| 199 lb cruiserweight fight
|-
| Win
| align=center| 1-0
| Joe Parkinson
| KO 
| Kings Promotions
| 
| align=center| 1
| align=center| 0:35
| Philadelphia, Pennsylvania, United States
|  Pro Debut 
|

References

1985 births
Living people
People from Delaware County, Pennsylvania
American practitioners of Brazilian jiu-jitsu
American male mixed martial artists
Mixed martial artists from Pennsylvania
Welterweight mixed martial artists
Mixed martial artists utilizing wrestling
Mixed martial artists utilizing Brazilian jiu-jitsu